Lake Maloya is a reservoir in Sugarite Canyon State Park on the New Mexico-Colorado State border, northeast of Raton, New Mexico.
It is the main source of water for the city and its outlying areas.

References

Bodies of water of Colfax County, New Mexico
Maloya
Maloya
Bodies of water of Las Animas County, Colorado